Waking the Dead is a British television police procedural crime drama series that was produced by the BBC featuring a fictional Cold Case unit comprising CID police officers, a psychological profiler and a forensic scientist. Nine series of the show were broadcast over the course of eleven years.

Episodes

Pilot (2000)

Series 1 (2001)

Series 2 (2002)

Series 3 (2003)

Series 4 (2004)

Series 5 (2005)

Series 6 (2007)

Series 7 (2008)

Series 8 (2009)

Series 9 (2011)

References

BBC-related lists
Lists of British crime drama television series episodes
Lists of British mystery television series episodes
 Episodes